The Canterbury, or Canterbury Merchant, is the ship that transported William Penn and James Logan from England to Philadelphia in 1699. The Canterbury set sail from the Isle of Wight on 3 September 1699, reaching Philadelphia on 3 December 1699. The captain of the Canterbury is recorded as either "Henry Tregeny" or "Hen. Weagene". During the voyage the Canterbury reportedly survived an attack by pirates.

Passengers

The passenger list, even if one was recorded, is not extant. Therefore, alternative sources have been used to reconstruct the list of passengers and crew.

 Confirmed:
 William Penn, Hannah Penn (second wife of William Penn) and Letitia Penn (daughter of William Penn by his first wife)
 James Logan, secretary to William Penn
 Henry Tregeny  or Henry Weagene 
 Probable:
 John Warder 
 Solomon Warder and Mary Howel 
 Thomas Parson 
 Randolph Janney 
 James Streater and family 
 Timothy Hudson 
 Joseph Austill 
 William Smith, wife and family 
 Samuel Sidon 
 Abraham Scott 
 Thomas Storey 
 James Barton 
 John and Rebecca Linton 
 Mary Doe 
 Thomas Story 
 John and Jacob Holcombe 
 Thomas and John Bye
 John Webb

Notes and references

1690s ships
Penn family
History of Philadelphia
Ships attacked and captured by pirates